Ragnhild Queseth Haarstad (4 April 1939 in Grue – 6 June 2017) was a Norwegian politician for the Centre Party. She was Minister of Local Government from 1997 to 1999. She died on 6 June 2017 at the age of 78.

References

1939 births
2017 deaths
People from Grue, Norway
Ministers of Local Government and Modernisation of Norway
Centre Party (Norway) politicians
Members of the Storting
20th-century Norwegian politicians
20th-century Norwegian women politicians
Women members of the Storting
Women government ministers of Norway